Niko Galešić (born 26 March 2001) is a German-born Croatian footballer currently playing as a defender for Rijeka.

Career statistics

Club

Honours

Rijeka
 Croatian Cup: 2020

References

2001 births
Living people
Footballers from Berlin
German people of Croatian descent
Association football defenders
Croatian footballers
Croatia youth international footballers
HNK Rijeka players
NK Hrvatski Dragovoljac players
Croatian Football League players